Triangle Point is the low ice-free tipped point forming the northwest side of the entrance to Shopski Cove in the south coast of Parvomay Neck linking the northwest and southeast parts of Greenwich Island in the South Shetland Islands, Antarctica.  The area was frequented by early 19th century sealers operating from Yankee Harbour.

The feature was charted and descriptively named by the Discovery Investigations in 1935.

Location
British mapping in 1935 and 1968, Argentine in 1948, Chilean in 1974, and Bulgarian in 2005 and 2009.

Maps
 South Shetland Islands. Scale 1:200000 topographic map. DOS 610 Sheet W 62 58. Tolworth, UK, 1968.
 L.L. Ivanov et al. Antarctica: Livingston Island and Greenwich Island, South Shetland Islands. Scale 1:100000 topographic map. Sofia: Antarctic Place-names Commission of Bulgaria, 2005.
 L.L. Ivanov. Antarctica: Livingston Island and Greenwich, Robert, Snow and Smith Islands. Scale 1:120000 topographic map.  Troyan: Manfred Wörner Foundation, 2009.  
 Antarctic Digital Database (ADD). Scale 1:250000 topographic map of Antarctica. Scientific Committee on Antarctic Research (SCAR). Since 1993, regularly updated.
 L.L. Ivanov. Antarctica: Livingston Island and Smith Island. Scale 1:100000 topographic map. Manfred Wörner Foundation, 2017.

References
 SCAR Composite Antarctic Gazetteer.

Headlands of Greenwich Island